Rhysodesmus is a genus of flat-backed millipedes in the family Xystodesmidae. There are at least 90 described species in Rhysodesmus., ranging from El Salvador to the Southern United States.

Species
These 92 species belong to the genus Rhysodesmus:

 Rhysodesmus acolhuus (Humbert & DeSaussure, 1869) i c g
 Rhysodesmus agrestis Shelley, 1999 g
 Rhysodesmus alpuyecus Chamberlin, 1943 i c g
 Rhysodesmus angelus (Karsch, 1881) i c g
 Rhysodesmus angustus Loomis, 1966 i c g
 Rhysodesmus arcuatus Pocock, 1910 i c g
 Rhysodesmus attemsi Pocock, 1909 i c g
 Rhysodesmus bolivari Chamberlin, 1943 i c g
 Rhysodesmus bonus Chamberlin, 1943 c g
 Rhysodesmus byersi Loomis, 1966 i c g
 Rhysodesmus championi Pocock, 1909 i c g
 Rhysodesmus chelifer Takakuwa, 1941 c g
 Rhysodesmus chisosi Shelley, 1989 i c g
 Rhysodesmus cohaesivus Wang, 1957 c g
 Rhysodesmus consobrinus (DeSaussure, 1859) i c g
 Rhysodesmus constrictus Loomis, 1966 i c g
 Rhysodesmus contiguus Wang, 1957 c g
 Rhysodesmus coriaceus Loomis, 1968 i c g
 Rhysodesmus cuernavacae Chamberlin, 1942 i c g
 Rhysodesmus cumbres Chamberlin, 1943 i c g
 Rhysodesmus dampfi (Verhoeff, 1932) i c g
 Rhysodesmus dasypus (Gervais, 1847) i c g
 Rhysodesmus depressus Loomis, 1966 i c g
 Rhysodesmus diacanthus Miyosi, 1952 c g
 Rhysodesmus elestribus Chamberlin, 1943 i c g
 Rhysodesmus esperanzae Chamberlin, 1943 i c g
 Rhysodesmus eunis Chamberlin, 1943 i c g
 Rhysodesmus eusculptus Chamberlin, 1941 i c g
 Rhysodesmus flavocinctus Pocock, 1909 i c g
 Rhysodesmus fraternus (DeSaussure, 1859) i c g
 Rhysodesmus frionus Chamberlin, 1943 i c g
 Rhysodesmus garcianus Chamberlin, 1943 i c g
 Rhysodesmus geniculatus Takakuwa, 1941 c g
 Rhysodesmus godmani Pocock, 1909 i c g
 Rhysodesmus guardanus Chamberlin, 1943 i c g
 Rhysodesmus hamatilis Loomis, 1966 i c g
 Rhysodesmus ikaoensis Takakuwa, 1942 c g
 Rhysodesmus intermedius Chamberlin, 1943 i c g
 Rhysodesmus inustus Pocock, 1910 i c g
 Rhysodesmus jugosus Loomis, 1966 i c g
 Rhysodesmus kitazawai Miyosi, 1953 c g
 Rhysodesmus knighti Chamberlin, 1941 i c g
 Rhysodesmus latus Loomis, 1968 i c g
 Rhysodesmus leonensis Chamberlin, 1941 i c g
 Rhysodesmus malinche Chamberlin, 1943 i c g
 Rhysodesmus marcosus Chamberlin, 1952 i c g
 Rhysodesmus mayanus Chamberlin, 1925 i c g
 Rhysodesmus minor (Chamberlin, 1943) i c g
 Rhysodesmus montezumae (DeSaussure, 1859) i c g
 Rhysodesmus morelus Chamberlin, 1943 i c g
 Rhysodesmus murallensis Loomis, 1966 i c g
 Rhysodesmus mystecus (Humbert & DeSaussure, 1869) i c g
 Rhysodesmus nahuus (Humbert & DeSaussure, 1869) i c g
 Rhysodesmus notostictus Pocock, 1910 i c g
 Rhysodesmus obliquus Loomis, 1966 i c g
 Rhysodesmus ochraceus Gressitt, 1941 c g
 Rhysodesmus otomitus (DeSaussure, 1859) i c g
 Rhysodesmus perotenus Chamberlin, 1943 i c g
 Rhysodesmus potosianus Chamberlin, 1942 i c g
 Rhysodesmus punctatus Loomis, 1966 i c g
 Rhysodesmus pusilllus Pocock, 1910 c
 Rhysodesmus pusillus Pocock, 1909 i c g
 Rhysodesmus restans Hoffman, 1998 i c g
 Rhysodesmus rubrimarginis Chamberlin, 1943 i c g
 Rhysodesmus salvini Pocock, 1910 c g
 Rhysodesmus sandersi Causey, 1954 i c g
 Rhysodesmus scutata Takakuwa, 1942 c g
 Rhysodesmus semicircularis Takakuwa, 1941 g
 Rhysodesmus semicirculatus Takakuwa, 1941 c g
 Rhysodesmus semiovatus Loomis, 1966 i c g
 Rhysodesmus seriatus Chamberlin, 1947 i c g
 Rhysodesmus serrulatus Miyosi, 1952 c g
 Rhysodesmus shirozui Takakuwa, 1942 c g
 Rhysodesmus simplex Loomis, 1966 i c g
 Rhysodesmus smithi Pocock, 1910 i c g
 Rhysodesmus spinosissimus Miyosi, 1952 c g
 Rhysodesmus spiralipes Takakuwa, 1942 c g
 Rhysodesmus stolli Pocock, 1909 i c g
 Rhysodesmus tabascensis Pocock, 1909 i c g
 Rhysodesmus tacubayae Chamberlin, 1943 i c g
 Rhysodesmus taiwanus Takakuwa, 1942 c g
 Rhysodesmus tepanecus (DeSaussure, 1859) i c g
 Rhysodesmus tepoztlanus Chamberlin, 1943 i c g
 Rhysodesmus texicolens (Chamberlin, 1938) i c g b
 Rhysodesmus toltecus (DeSaussure, 1859) i c g
 Rhysodesmus totonacus (DeSaussure, 1859) i c g
 Rhysodesmus tuberculatus Takakuwa, 1942 c g
 Rhysodesmus variatus Pocock, 1895 c g
 Rhysodesmus vicinus (DeSaussure, 1859) i c g
 Rhysodesmus violaceus (Brolemann, 1900) i c g
 Rhysodesmus zapotecus (DeSaussure, 1860) i c g
 Rhysodesmus zendalus (Humbert & DeSaussure, 1869) i c g

Data sources: i = ITIS, c = Catalogue of Life, g = GBIF, b = Bugguide.net

References

Further reading

External links

 

Polydesmida
Articles created by Qbugbot
Millipedes of North America
Millipedes of Central America